One hundred and fifty-four Guggenheim Fellowships were awarded in 1951. $568,000 was disbursed.

1951 U.S. and Canadian Fellows

1951 Latin American and Caribbean Fellows

See also
 Guggenheim Fellowship
 List of Guggenheim Fellowships awarded in 1950
 List of Guggenheim Fellowships awarded in 1952

References

1951
1951 awards